Juan Sebastián Cabal and Robert Farah were the defending champions but decided not to participate.
Jamie Delgado and Ken Skupski won the title defeating Adrián Menéndez and Walter Trusendi in the final 6–1, 6–4.

Seeds

Draw

Draw

References
 Main Draw

Roma Open - Doubles
2012 Doubles